Mount Keith is a mountain on the crest of California's Sierra Nevada, between Mount Bradley to the north, and Junction Peak to the southwest. Its north and west facing slopes feed the Kings River watershed by way of Bubbs Creek, and its east and south slopes feed the Owens River via Shepherd Creek. By the same dividing line, Keith stands on the boundary of Kings Canyon National Park to the northwest, and the John Muir Wilderness to the southeast. It is a thirteener, a mountain which has a height over 13000 feet.

The peak was named for artist and Sierra Club member, William Keith, by Helen Gompertz (later Helen LeConte) in July 1896.

The first ascending party consisted of Cornelius Beach Bradley, Jennie and Robert Price, and Joseph Shinn. Scrambling over boulders and scree from the upper lakes of Center Basin, they made the summit by the Northwest Face route on July 6, 1898.

See also
 List of mountain peaks of California

References

External links
 
 

Mountains of Kings Canyon National Park
Mountains of the John Muir Wilderness
Mountains of Tulare County, California
Mountains of Inyo County, California
Mount Keith
Mountains of Northern California